J.D. Garrett (November 28, 1941 – July 4, 2012) was an American football halfback. He played for the Boston Patriots from 1964 to 1967.

References

1941 births
2012 deaths
American football halfbacks
Grambling State Tigers football players
Boston Patriots players